Straight Branch is a tributary of South Deepwater Creek in Bates County, in the U.S. state of Missouri.

Straight Branch was so named because of its relatively straight watercourse.

See also
List of rivers of Missouri

References

Rivers of Bates County, Missouri
Rivers of Missouri